Gaiti Hasan (born 19 November 1956) is an Indian scientist who researches in the fields of molecular biology, genetics, neuroscience and cell signalling. Hasan is a Fellow of the Indian National Science Academy (INSA), the apex body of Indian scientists and technologists. 2013 onwards she has been serving as a Senior Professor at the National Centre for Biological Sciences (NCBS), Bangalore.

Education
Hasan studied in Aligarh as a child. Her parents taught at university, and her two sisters studied chemistry and physics. She went on to do a BSc in zoology from Miranda House, Delhi University in 1976. She completed a MSc in life sciences in 1978 and a M.Phil. in 1980 from Jawaharlal Nehru University, Delhi. In 1983, she received a PhD from the University of Cambridge for her dissertation on ribosomal RNA genes of Trypanosoma brucei. According to Hasan, it was while she was applying to universities for her PhD that she realised for the first time that "belonging to a minority could lead to discrimination". She believes this has led her to "consciously try and be supportive of other woman scientists, be they students or colleagues".

Career
Presently she works at NCBS (National Centre for Biological Sciences) where she researches on the systemic and cellular consequences of changes in intracellular calcium levels in animals. In 1983, Hasan joined the Tata Institute of Fundamental Research (TIFR) in Mumbai, as a visiting fellow and research associate in the molecular biology unit. She was a visiting scientist at the biology department in Brandeis University Massachusetts in 1992.

Awards and recognition
Hasan has received a scholarship from the Inlaks Foundation, a British Overseas Research Student Award, a fellowship from the Wellcome Trust and a Rockefeller Biotechnology Career Fellowship. In 2006, she was elected a Fellow of the Indian Academy of Sciences, Bangalore and in 2007, as a Member of the Asia-Pacific Molecular Biology Network. She is also a fellow of Indian National Science Academy (INSA).

Publications

References

Living people
Indian women molecular biologists
Jawaharlal Nehru University alumni
Alumni of the University of Cambridge
Delhi University alumni
Indian molecular biologists
20th-century Indian biologists
20th-century Indian women scientists
21st-century Indian biologists
People from Aligarh
Women scientists from Uttar Pradesh
21st-century Indian women scientists
1956 births